Callibaetis montanus is a species of small minnow mayfly in the family Baetidae. It is found in Central America and North America. In North America its range includes all of Mexico and the southwestern United States.

References

Further reading

 
 
 
 
 
 

Mayflies